Umhlanga , or Reed Dance ceremony, is an annual Swazi event. In Eswatini, tens of thousands of unmarried and childless Swazi girls and women travel from the various chiefdoms to the Ludzidzini Royal Village to participate in the eight-day event. The young, unmarried girls were placed in female age-regiments; girls who had fallen pregnant outside wedlock had their families fined a cow.

History
Umhlanga was created in the 1940s Eswatini under the rule of Sobhuza II, and is an adaptation of the much older Umchwasho ceremony. The reed dance continues to be practised today in Eswatini. In South Africa, the reed dance was introduced in 1991 by Goodwill Zwelithini, the former King of the Zulus. The dance in South Africa takes place in Nongoma, a royal kraal of the Zulu king.

South Africa

In South Africa, the ceremony is known as Umkhosi woMhlanga, and takes place every year in September at the Enyokeni Royal Palace in Nongoma Enyokeni, KwaZulu-Natal. The girls come from all parts of Zululand, and in recent years there are also smaller groups from Eswatini, as well as more distant places such as Botswana and Pondoland.

All girls are required to undergo a virginity test before they are allowed to participate in a royal dance. In recent years the testing practice has been met with some opposition.

The girls wear traditional attire, including beadwork, izigege, izinculuba and imintsha that show their bottoms. They also wear anklets, bracelets, necklaces, and colourful sashes. Each sash has appendages of a different colour, which denote whether or not the girl is betrothed.

As part of the ceremony, the young women dance bare-breasted for their king, and each maiden carries a long reed, which is then deposited as they approach the king. The girls take care to choose only the longest and strongest reeds, and then carry them towering above their heads in a slow procession up the hill to Enyokeni Palace. The procession is led by the chief Zulu princess, who takes a prominent role throughout the festival. If the reed should break before the girl reaches that point, it is considered a sign that the girl has already been sexually active.

The ceremony was reintroduced by King Goodwill Zwelethini in 1991, as a means to encourage young Zulu girls to delay sexual activity until marriage, and thus limit the possibility of HIV transmission. In 2007, about 30,000 girls took part in the event. The organisers of the ceremony have occasionally enforced strict rules on photographers, as some of them have been accused of publishing pictures of the rites on pornographic websites.

In past years, the event was attended by former President of South Africa, Jacob Zuma (himself a Zulu), and former Premier of KwaZulu-Natal, Zweli Mkhize.

Eswatini

In Eswatini, girls begin the rite by gathering at the Queen Mother's royal village, which currently is Ludzidzini Royal Village. After arriving at the Queen Mother's royal residence, the women disperse the following night to surrounding areas and cut tall reeds. The following night, they bundle the reeds together and bring them back to the Queen Mother to be used in repairing holes in the reed windscreen surrounding the royal village.

After a day of rest and washing, the women prepare their traditional costumes consisting of a bead necklace, rattling anklets made from cocoons, a sash, and skirt. Many of them carry the bush knives, which they had earlier used to cut the reeds, as symbols of their virginity.

The women sing and dance as they parade in front of the royal family as well as a crowd of dignitaries, spectators, and tourists. After the parade, groups from select villages take to the centre of the field and put on a special performance for the crowd. The King's many daughters and royal princesses also participate in the reed dance ceremony and are distinguished by the crown of red feathers they wear in their hair.

During the ceremony, the king, with the help of his mother and elder sister, chooses 365 girls. A large part of the 365 girls will live in a palace in the center of Mbabane. Of these 365, the king can choose a new wife, which he does not do every year. He has these girls at his disposal sexually during one year to choose .

The present form of the Reed Dance developed in the 1940s from the Umcwasho custom, where young girls were placed in age regiments to ensure their virginity. Once they had reached marriageable age, they would perform labour for the Queen Mother followed by dancing and a feast. The official purpose of the annual ceremony is to preserve the women's chastity, provide tribute labour for the Queen Mother, and produce solidarity among the women through working together.

Nudity controversy
The reed dance videos were once classified as age-restricted content by YouTube, which angered the users who had uploaded them. This included Lazi Dlamini, the head of TV Yabantu, an online video production company that aims to produce content that “protects, preserves and restores African values”. Working with more than 200 cultural groupings across the country and in neighbouring Eswatini, Dlamini organised a series of protests against Google to force them to rethink their position. YouTube apologized, and allowed the showing of bonafide African traditional videos. According to a representative for the company, they lifted the restriction, as it is not Google's policy to "restrict nudity in such instances where it is culturally or traditionally appropriate.”

References

External links 
 
 African Marriage (section on Umhlanga)
 

Swazi culture
Zulu culture
Nudity
Ceremonies in South Africa
Ceremonies in Eswatini
Annual events in South Africa
Annual events in Eswatini
August events
September events
Spring (season) events in South Africa
Dance in South Africa
Spring holidays (Southern Hemisphere)